Frontier was the name of three steamships operated by African Coasters (Pty) Ltd, Durban, South Africa.

, in service 1922–26
, in service 1952–57
, in service 1958–66

Ship names